Celia Diana Savile Imrie (born 15 July 1952) is an English actress and author. She is best known for her film roles, including the Bridget Jones film series, Calendar Girls (2003), Nanny McPhee (2005), The Best Exotic Marigold Hotel (2011), The Second Best Exotic Marigold Hotel (2015), The English dub of The Big Bad Fox and Other Tales... (2017), Mamma Mia! Here We Go Again (2018), Malevolent (2018) and for the FX TV series Better Things (2016-2022).

In the United Kingdom she is known for her work with Victoria Wood, including Victoria Wood: As Seen on TV (1985–1987), the sitcom dinnerladies (1998–2000) and Acorn Antiques: The Musical!, for which she won the 2006 Laurence Olivier Award for Best Performance in a Supporting Role in a Musical.

Early life and education
Imrie was born on 15 July 1952 in Guildford, Surrey, the fourth of five children of Diana Elizabeth Blois (née Cator) and David Andrew Imrie, a radiologist. Her father was from Glasgow, Scotland. Imrie is the ten-times-great granddaughter of the infamous Frances Carr, Countess of Somerset. Imrie was educated at Guildford High School, an independent school for girls in her home town of Guildford, followed by the Guildford School of Acting.

Career

Film
Imrie's film credits include Nanny McPhee, Hilary and Jackie (playing Iris du Pré), and the 1997 film The Borrowers, in which she played Homily Clock. Other films include Bridget Jones's Diary, Calendar Girls, Highlander, and as Fighter Pilot Bravo 5 in Star Wars: Episode I – The Phantom Menace. In 2007 she appeared in St Trinian's.

Television
Imrie's television credits include Bergerac,The Nightmare Man, Oranges Are Not the Only Fruit, Casualty, Absolutely Fabulous, The Darling Buds of May and Upstairs, Downstairs.

In the 2000 miniseries of Gormenghast, she played Lady Gertrude. She also appeared in the 2005 BBC television drama Mr. Harvey Lights a Candle, where she played the role of a teacher taking an unruly party of pupils on a day-trip to Salisbury Cathedral. She starred alongside Nicholas Lyndhurst in the BBC sitcom After You've Gone (2007–2008), and in the ITV1 drama Kingdom (2007–2009) with Stephen Fry. Her part in After You've Gone has, whilst being critically acclaimed, been described as "criminally squandered". In 2013, she guest-starred in the BBC's Doctor Who, playing the villainous Miss Kizlet in "The Bells of Saint John". In May 2016, she made her US television debut in the DC action-adventure series Legends of Tomorrow. Since September 2016 she has starred as Phyllis in the FX series Better Things. In December 2021, Imrie narrated the BBC's Talking Pictures: Film's Family Favourites.

Theatre
In 2005, she received very positive reviews for her US stage debut in Unsuspecting Susan. In 2009, she appeared in Plague Over England in the West End, a play about John Gielgud, and received a positive reviews for her performance. That same year, she appeared in the world premiere of Robin Soans' Mixed Up North, directed by Max Stafford-Clark. In 2010, she appeared alongside Robin Soans in a production of Sheridan's The Rivals.

Imrie narrated during the ceremonial event held to mark the 75th anniversary of D-day at Portsmouth in 2019.

Radio
Imrie's radio work includes parts in BBC Radio 4's No Commitments and Bleak Expectations. " The Adventures of a Black Bag and Doctor Finlay – Further Adventures of a Black Bag" 2002 and 2003 ; In early 2007, she narrated the book Arabella, broadcast over two weeks as the Book at Bedtime.

She appeared on BBC Radio 4's The Museum of Curiosity in October 2019. Her hypothetical donation to this imaginary museum was "A half-burnt candle".

Work with Victoria Wood
Imrie is perhaps best known in the United Kingdom for her frequent collaborations with Victoria Wood, with whom she appeared in TV programmes such as the sitcom dinnerladies and sketch show Victoria Wood: As Seen on TV. It was on the latter show in 1985 that she first played the part of Miss Babs, owner of Acorn Antiques, a parody of the low-budget British soap opera Crossroads. These sketches became such a British institution that in 2005 Wood turned the show into Acorn Antiques: The Musical!, a West End musical, starring most of the original cast. Imrie won an Olivier Award in 2006 for her performance. The character is known for her frequent parodic flirtations with the customers and her interactions with the housekeeper, Mrs Overall (portrayed by Julie Walters).

Books
Her debut novel Not Quite Nice was published by Bloomsbury in 2015, had six weeks in the Sunday Times Top Ten, was cited by The Times as a 'delicious piece of entertainment', and also reached number 5 in the Apple ibook chart and 8 in Amazon's book chart. Her second novel, Nice Work (If You Can Get It), was published in 2016; and her third, Sail Away, was published in February 2018. Her next work, A Nice Cup of Tea, was published in 2019.

The Happy Hoofer (2011), Hodder & Stoughton, 
Not Quite Nice (2015), Bloomsbury Publishing, 
Nice Work (If You Can Get It) (2016), Bloomsbury Publishing, 
Sail Away (2018), Bloomsbury Publishing, 
A Nice Cup of Tea (2019), Bloomsbury Publishing. 
Orphans of the Storm (2021), Bloomsbury Publishing.

Mamma Mia! Here We Go Again
As part of the cast of the 2018 film Mamma Mia! Here We Go Again, Imrie achieved her first UK Top 40 single alongside Lily James with a cover of the ABBA song "When I Kissed the Teacher", which reached number 40 in August 2018.

Personal life
Imrie lives in London and in Nice, France. She has a son, Angus Imrie, with the actor Benjamin Whitrow, but has said that she "hated the idea of marriage", describing it as a "world of cover-up and compromise". Angus appears as her on-screen son in Kingdom and has acted in other productions, having studied drama and performance at the University of Warwick.

When she was 14, she was admitted to the Royal Waterloo Hospital suffering from anorexia nervosa. Under the care of controversial psychiatrist William Sargant, she was given electroshock and large doses of the anti-psychotic drug Largactil.

She was the guest on Desert Island Discs on BBC Radio 4 on 13 February 2011. In 2013, she was awarded an honorary doctorate by the University of Winchester.

Imrie was featured in the BBC genealogy series Who Do You Think You Are? in October 2012 and discovered that an ancestor on her mother's side was William, Lord Russell, a Whig parliamentarian executed for treason in 1683, after being found guilty of conspiring against Charles II. Imrie's great-great uncle, William Imrie, was a founder of the White Star Line and she is a descendant of Sir Cosmo Duff-Gordon who survived the sinking of the Titanic.

Awards
 (1992) The Clarence Derwent Award for Best Supporting Actress in The Sea
 (2006) Olivier Award for Best Performance in a Supporting Role in a Musical in Acorn Antiques:The Musical!
 (2017) UK WFTV (Women in Film and Television) Award for the EON Productions Lifetime Achievement

Filmography

Film

Television

Theatre
Source:

 1976: Now Here's a Funny Thing
 1976: Sherlock Holmes
 1976: The Adventures of Alice
 1977: Henry V
 1977: Love's Labour's Lost
 1977: The Boyfriend
 1978: As You Like It
 1978: Cabaret
 1978: Macbeth
 1978: 'Tis Pity She's a Whore
 1979: The Good Humoured Ladies
 1979: Pygmalion
 1980: Seduced
 1981: Heaven and Hell
 1981: A Waste of Time
 1982: Puntila and Matti, Master and Servant
 1982: Puss in Boots
 1982: Philosophy of the Boudoir
 1982: The Screens
 1983: Arms and the Man
 1983: Custom of the Country
 1983: The Merchant of Venice
 1983: Sirocco
 1983: Webster
 1984: Alfie
 1984: The Merchant of Venice
 1984: When I Was a Girl I Used to Scream and Shout
 1985: Particular Friendships
 1985: The Philanthropist
 1986: Last Waltz
 1987: School For Wives
 1987: Yerma
 1988: Doctor Angelus
 1988: The Madwoman of Chaillot
 1990: In Pursuit of the English
 1990: Hangover Square
 1990: No One Sees the Video
 1991: The Sea
 1995: The Hothouse
 1996: Habeas Corpus
 1997: Dona Rosita the Spinster
 1998: The School for Scandal
 2003: The Way of the World
 2003: Unsuspecting Susan
 2005: Acorn Antiques: The Musical!
 2005: Unsuspecting Susan
 2009: Plague Over England
 2009: Mixed Up North
 2010: The Rivals
 2010: Polar Bears
 2010: Hay Fever
 2011: Drama at Inish
 2011–2012: Noises Off
 2016: King Lear
 2018–2019: Party Time and Celebration

References

External links

Celia Imrie at the British Film Institute
Celia Imrie at the BFI Screenonline

Celia Imrie Wins Olivier Award
Interview with Celia Imrie
Celia Imrie talks about Star Wars
Celia Imrie Article with The Daily Telegraph
Photograph of Celia as Marianne Bellshade in 1982 in Bergerac

1952 births
Living people
20th-century English actresses
21st-century English actresses
Actresses from Surrey
Alumni of the Guildford School of Acting
Anglo-Scots
Clarence Derwent Award winners
English film actresses
English musical theatre actresses
English people of Scottish descent
English television actresses
English women comedians
Laurence Olivier Award winners
People educated at Guildford High School
Actors from Guildford
WFTV Award winners